Clinging with Hate or Clinging to Hate (Mone Swel, also spells Mone Swal - ) is a 2018 Burmese religious drama film directed by Aww Yatha and starring Nay Toe, Kyaw Kyaw Bo, Min Thway, Phway Phway and Aye Wutyi Thaung. It became one of highest-grossing films in Myanmar. This film was premiered in Myanmar cinemas and also screened in Singapore at the same day.

Plot
Based on the true story, In 1959 in Central Burma, two evil brother Nga Htoo Zaw and  Nga Htoo Maw reincarnated into twins from hatred and revenge. The Abbot tell them they must separate and release hatred and learn how to love or otherwise they will suffer in Samsara (circle of life and death) for eternity.

Cast
 Nay Toe as Nga Htoo Zaw in past life, the two Buddhist monks (Dual Role) in present life 
 Kyaw Kyaw Bo as Ko Phoe Aung
 Min Thway as Nga Htoo Maw in past life
 Phway Phway as Ma Thel Oohm (wife of Ko Phoe Aung)
 Aye Wutyi Thaung as Ma Kyar Ooh in past life, Ma Theigi in present life

Awards and nominations

References

Burmese drama films